Nigton is an unincorporated community in Trinity County, Texas. It is 17 miles from Groveton. In 2000, the population was 87, many of whom were descendants of the town founders.

History
The town was founded in 1873 by former slaves. Jeff Carter, a civic leader and former slave during the early years of the settlement, suggested the name Nigton. In 1894, a post office was established. By 1896, the community had three churches, a saw mill and gin, a wagon maker, a shoemaker, and a reported population of 500. The post office was closed in 1923. In the 1940s, only a school, church, and store remained. It had a population of only 10 residents. In the 1990s, the population began to grow, reporting 34 residents in the 1990 United States Census, many of whom were descendants of the original settlers. By the 2000 United States Census, the population was 87.

In the 2016 United States presidential election, the precinct were Nigton is located was the only precinct in Trinity County that the majority of votes were for Democratic candidate Hillary Clinton. This makes Nigton a voter island in a predominantly conservative Republican county and region.

References

External links
 Pine Island School (Nigton) 1928
 Trinity County Training School Shop (Nigton) 1930

Unincorporated communities in Trinity County, Texas
Unincorporated communities in Texas